Shonen Magz was a Shōnen-oriented manga magazine published monthly by Elex Media Komputindo. It was the Indonesian version of the Japanese Shōnen Magazine and therefore, contained Kodansha-published works only. It was published shortly after the success of the local edition of Nakayoshi.

Despite its orientation towards the male spectrum of manga readers, censorship iwas still considered to be too strict although a lot more lenient when compared to older Shōnen-oriented manga published by Elex.

In July 2013 the magazine was cancelled with the volume 7.

Manga Series

See also 
List of manga magazines published outside of Japan

References

External links 
 Publisher website (in Indonesian)

2004 establishments in Indonesia
2013 disestablishments in Indonesia
Anime and manga magazines
Defunct magazines published in Indonesia
Indonesian comics titles
Magazines published in Indonesia
Indonesian-language magazines
Magazines established in 2004
Magazines disestablished in 2013